The Frank C. Barnes House, also known as the Barnes Mansion, is a house located in northeast Portland, Oregon, United States, that is listed on the National Register of Historic Places. Author Beverly Cleary called the house "haunted" in her Ramona Quimby series.

Its design is tentatively ascribed to Portland architect David L. Williams.

See also
 National Register of Historic Places listings in Northeast Portland, Oregon

References

External links
 

1913 establishments in Oregon
Colonial Revival architecture in Oregon
Houses completed in 1913
Houses on the National Register of Historic Places in Portland, Oregon
Beaumont-Wilshire, Portland, Oregon
Portland Historic Landmarks